The 2003 Kebbi State gubernatorial election occurred on April 19, 2003. ANPP candidate Adamu Aliero won the election, defeating PDP Saidu Samaila Sambawa and 2 other candidates.

Results
Adamu Aliero from the ANPP won the election. 4 candidates contested in the election.

The total number of registered voters in the state was 1,343,549, total votes cast was 886,324, valid votes was 802,509 and rejected votes was 83,815.

Adamu Aliero, (ANPP)- 502,903
Saidu Samaila Sambawa, PDP- 299,120
Wali Ahmed, NDP- 252
Kabiru Tanimu Turaki, UNPP- 234

References 

Kebbi State gubernatorial election
Kebbi State gubernatorial election
2003